The British Salonika Army was a field army of the British Army during World War I. After the armistice in November 1918, it was disbanded, but component units became the newly formed Army of the Black Sea, and General Milne remained in command.

First World War
The Army was formed in Salonika under Lieutenant-General Bryan Mahon to oppose Bulgarian advances in the region as part of the Macedonian front. The army arrived in Salonika (along with French troops) on 15 October 1915. In May 1916 Lieutenant-General George Milne replaced Bryan Mahon as commander of the Army. It eventually comprised two corps and as the Army of the Black Sea remained in place until 1921. The dead of the British Salonika Army are commemorated by the Doiran Memorial.

Component units 
British Salonika Force, March 1917

XII Corps
22nd Division
26th Division
60th (2/2nd London) Division
1/1st Lothians and Border Horse

XVI Corps
10th (Irish) Division
27th Division
28th Division
1/1st Surrey Yeomanry

GHQ Troops
7th Mounted Brigade
8th Mounted Brigade
16th Wing, Royal Flying Corps

Commanders-in-Chief
Commanders:
4 November 1915 - 15 November 1915 : General Charles C. Monro (concurrent with being Commander, Mediterranean Expeditionary Force)
15 November 1915 - 9 May 1916 : Lieutenant-General Bryan Mahon
9 May 1916 – 3 January 1917 : Lieutenant-General George Milne
3 January 1917 – 11 January 1917 : Lieutenant-General Henry Wilson (temporary)
11 January 1917 – September 1918 : General George Milne
February 1919 – November 1920 : Lieutenant-General Henry Wilson (concurrent with being Commander, Allied Forces in Constantinople)
 November 1920: Lieutenant-General Sir Charles Harington (continued after 1921 as GOC-in-C Allied Forces of Occupation, Turkey)

References

Bibliography

Military units and formations established in 1915
Salonika
Salonika
Macedonian front
Greece in World War I